Dennis Lyons was a British scientist.

Den(n)is Lyons may also refer to:
Dennis Lyons, Baron Lyons of Brighton (1918–1978), British public relations consultant and peer
Denny Lyons (1866–1929), US baseball player
Denis Lyons (1935–2014), Irish politician